von Schwedler is a surname. Notable people with the surname include:

Alex von Schwedler (born 1980), Chilean footballer
Viktor von Schwedler (1885–1954), German military officer